Elections in the Republic of India in 1987 included elections to six state legislative assemblies, seats in the Rajya Sabha and the posts of President and vice president.

Legislative Assembly elections

Haryana

|- align=center
!style="background-color:#E9E9E9" class="unsortable"|
!style="background-color:#E9E9E9" align=center|Political Party
!style="background-color:#E9E9E9" |No. of candidates
!style="background-color:#E9E9E9" |No. of elected
!style="background-color:#E9E9E9" |Number of Votes
!style="background-color:#E9E9E9" |% of Votes
|-
| 
|align="left"|Lok Dal||69||60||2,349,397||38.58%
|-
| 
|align="left"|Bharatiya Janata Party||20||16||613,819||10.08%
|-
| 
|align="left"|Indian National Congress||0||5||1,776,820||29.18%
|-
| 
|align="left"|Communist Party of India (Marxist)||4||1||47,434||0.78%
|-
| 
|align="left"|Communist Party of India||5||1||32,738||0.54%
|-
| 
|align="left"|Independents||1045||7||1,128,803||18.54%
|-
|
! Total !! 1322 !! 90 !! 6,089,130 !!
|-
|}

Jammu and Kashmir

Kerala

Mizoram

Nagaland

West Bengal

Rajya Sabha

President

Vice-president

References

External Links
 

1987 elections in India
India
1987 in India
Elections in India by year